MLB International is a division of Major League Baseball primarily responsible for international broadcasts of games. In partnership with DirecTV and MLB Network, it produces and syndicates the All-Star Game, and the World Series, as well as the Caribbean Series, the Australian Baseball League Championship Series and the World Baseball Classic to broadcasters in over 200 countries, and the American Forces Network for U.S. military troops abroad. It previously broadcast the NLCS and ALCS, alternating between the two each year. MLB International broadcasts content that shows baseball in a local context, e.g. sneaker shopping in Japan or baseball games in India, and explains concepts and rules of baseball to viewers who may not be familiar with the sport.

Commentators
From  until  and again starting in 2010, Gary Thorne served as the play-by-play man for the World Series on Armed Forces Radio and MLB International.

Dave O'Brien provided commentary for MLB International's coverage of the World Series from 2004 until 2009. O'Brien teamed with his usual ESPN partner Rick Sutcliffe on broadcasts of the World Series and the American League Championship Series for MLB International.

From 1996 to 2002, and 2010-2014, MLB International broadcast the League Championship Series alternately, with the American League Championship Series in even-numbered years and the National League Championship Series in odd-numbered years.

Since 2015, production of the MLB International broadcasts has been assumed by the MLB Network. Matt Vasgersian (formerly of ESPN Sunday Night Baseball and today part of Fox Sports) in addition to the MLB Network, also current play-by-play television announcer for the Los Angeles Angels (AL) and former play-by-play television announcer for the San Diego Padres (NL)) has served as the play-by-play commentator; for the 2016 World Series onward, he was joined by Buck Martinez (play-by-play analyst of the Toronto Blue Jays for Sportsnet—which has carried the world feeds due to his involvement, and former color commentator for TBS) on color. Since 2018, with Matt now with ESPN part-time in addition to his MLB Network duties, Buck was joined for the All-Star Game duties by former Sunday Night Baseball voice Dan Shulman (who calls play-by-play on selected Blue Jays games on Sportsnet with Martinez on color). 

In 2021, MLB Network's Scott Braun assumed the post as the main play-by-play announcer for MLB International's broadcasts. He was replaced in 2022 by Jason Benetti (NBC Sports Chicago) for the English-language international MLB All-Star Game coverage and Dave Flemming (NBC Sports Bay Area, KNBR) for the global World Series coverage.

Commentator pairings 
 Gary Thorne and Ken Singleton (All-Star Game, League Championship Series and the World Series, 1996–2003)
 Dave O'Brien and Rick Sutcliffe (All-Star Game, ALCS and the World Series, 2004–2009)
 Gary Thorne and Rick Sutcliffe (All-Star Game, League Championship Series and the World Series, 2010–2014)
 Matt Vasgersian and John Smoltz (All-Star Game and the World Series, 2015)
 Matt Vasgersian and Mark DeRosa (All-Star Game only, 2016)
 Matt Vasgersian and Buck Martinez (All-Star Game, 2017, World Series, 2016-2020)
 Paul Severino and Joe Magrane (World Baseball Classic Pool A only, 2017)
 Rich Waltz and Buck Martinez (World Baseball Classic Pools B and E only, 2017)
 Matt Vasgersian, John Smoltz, and Jon Morosi (World Baseball Classic Pools C, D and F, round robin, semifinal and championship games only, 2017)
 Dan Shulman and Buck Martinez (All-Star Game only, 2018–2019)
 Scott Braun and Cliff Floyd (All-Star Game only, 2021)
 Scott Braun and Dan Plesac (World Series, 2021)
 Jason Benetti and Dan Plesac (All-Star Game only, 2022-present)
 Dave Flemming and Dan Plesac (World Series, 2022-present)

MLB International broadcasters 
 Worldwide (U.S. military bases only): American Forces Network
 Australasia: ESPN Australia
 Canada: Sportsnet (English), TVA Sports (French)
 Caribbean: ESPN Caribbean
 Europe: beIN Sports France (France), ESPN Netherlands (Netherlands), Movistar Deportes (Spain), BT Sport 4 (UK and Ireland), Arena Sport (Balkans), DAZN (Austria, Germany, Liechtenstein, Luxembourg, Switzerland), Sport TV (Hungary), Sky Sport (Italy, San Marino, Vatican City), Viaplay (Nordics)
 Japan: NHK, J Sports
 India: Star Sports, Fancode
 South Korea: SPOTV
 Latin America: ESPN Latin America, ESPN Brazil (Brazil), Fox Sports (Mexico), RPC-TV, TV Max (Panama), Televisa (Mexico), Meridiano Televisión (Venezuela), Telecaribe (Colombia)
 Dominican Republic: Tele Antillas and Coral 39
 Puerto Rico: WAPA-TV
 Curaçao: Telecuraçao
 Middle East and North Africa: beIN Sports Middle East
 Africa: ESPN Africa
 Taiwan: CTS, ELTA TV, Videoland
 Southeast Asia (except Vietnam):SPOTV (World Baseball Classic only, starting 2023)
 United States: During Game 1 of the 2015 World Series, due to a power outage that affected a studio truck producing Fox's domestic coverage of the game, Fox temporarily switched to the MLB International feed of the game in order to restore coverage. The broadcast temporarily used the MLB International commentary, but was later overdubbed with Fox's broadcast team (led by Joe Buck) before the standard Fox Sports production was restored.

See also
Major League Baseball International broadcasting
List of sports television broadcast contracts

References

External links
MLB International Broadcasting Information
Major League Baseball International inks three new broadcast deals in advance of the 81st MLB All-Star Game in Anaheim
MASN's Gary Thorne Named Play-by-Play Voice for Major League Baseball's International Broadcast of the ALCS and World Series
MLB All-Star Game to be Broadcast in 230 Countries and Territories Around the Globe
MLB International Delivers Pure Baseball to World Audience
MLB International to broadcast Series

International
Television channels and stations established in 1997
Sportsnet
Fox Networks Group
NHK
ESPN Latin America
Televisa
BT Sport